The 1990 NHL Entry Draft was the 28th NHL Entry Draft. It was hosted by the Vancouver Canucks at BC Place in Vancouver, British Columbia, on June 16, 1990. It is remembered as one of the deeper drafts in NHL history, with fourteen of the twenty-one first round picks going on to careers of at least 500 NHL games.

Nine of the twenty-one players drafted in the first round played 1,000 NHL games in their career.

The last active player in the NHL from this draft class was Jaromir Jagr, who played his last NHL game in the 2017–18 season. As of 2022, Jagr is still an active player with Rytiri Kladno of the ELH.

Venue

The 1990 NHL Entry Draft was originally scheduled to be held at the Pacific Coliseum, the home arena of the host Vancouver Canucks located on the site of the Pacific National Exhibition (PNE). However, the Canadian Union of Public Employees union representing the PNE employees—CUPE Local 1004—threatened to strike June 15, one day before the draft. Consequently, the NHL and the Canucks decided to move the draft to BC Place in order to avoid the potential strike and issues of public access to the venue. In addition to BC Place, the University of British Columbia, the Vancouver Convention Centre and the Hyatt Regency Vancouver were also considered as replacement venues.

The Canucks had estimated that 10,000 spectators would attend the draft, which had free admission. However, holding the venue in a higher capacity venue allowed for that estimate to nearly double, with 19,127 spectators—a then record for attendance at an NHL Entry Draft—attending the draft.

Top prospects

Heading into the 1990 NHL Entry Draft, Mike Ricci had spent the entire 1989–90 season ranked as the top prospect by the NHL Central Scouting Bureau. Prior to the release of the final rankings of North American skaters and goaltenders, it was speculated Owen Nolan, Keith Primeau and Petr Nedved would surpass Ricci; however, when the final rankings were released, Ricci remained as the top prospect. Jaromir Jagr was also considered to be one of the top prospects, but Central Scouting did not rank European players. Petr Nedved was an exception to that, as he played in North America after he defected his native Czechoslovakia.

Selections by round

Round one

Round two

Round three

Round four

Round five

Round six

Round seven

Round eight

Round nine

Round ten

Round eleven

Round twelve

Draftees based on nationality

See also
 1990 NHL Supplemental Draft
 1990–91 NHL season
 List of NHL players

Notes
 Although born in Northern Ireland, Owen Nolan has Canadian citizenship and represented Canada internationally.
 Although born in Czechoslovakia, Petr Nedved would obtain Canadian citizenship in 1993 and represented Canada internationally as a professional; he had represented Czechoslovakia in junior hockey in 1989.
 The Calgary Flames traded their first round selection in 1990, Detroit's second round selection in 1990 (previously acquired), and Minnesota's second round selection in 1990 (previously acquired) to the New Jersey Devils for the Devils' first and second round selections in 1990.
 The Montreal Canadiens traded Mike Lalor and their first round selection in 1990 to the St. Louis Blues for the Blues' first round selection in 1990 and the Blues' third round selection in the 1991 NHL Entry Draft (later re-acquired by St. Louis — Nathan LaFayette).
 The Buffalo Sabres traded Scott Arniel, Phil Housley, Jeff Parker, and their first round selection in 1990 to the Winnipeg Jets for Dale Hawerchuk and the Jets' first round selection in 1990.
 The St. Louis Blues traded Adrien Plavsic and Montreal's first round selection in 1990 (previously acquired) to the Vancouver Canucks for Harold Snepsts, Rich Sutter, and St. Louis' second round selection in 1990 (previously acquired).
 The Calgary Flames traded Brad McCrimmon to the Detroit Red Wings for the Wings' second round selection in 1990.
 The Calgary Flames traded Joe Mullen to the Pittsburgh Penguins for the Penguins' second round selection in 1990.
 The Calgary Flames traded Peter Lappin to the Minnesota North Stars for the North Stars' second round selection in 1990.
 The St. Louis Blues traded Robert Nordmark and their second round selection in 1990 to the Vancouver Canucks for Dave Richter.
 The Buffalo Sabres traded Kevin Maguire and their second round selection in 1990 to the Philadelphia Flyers for Jay Wells and the Flyers' fourth round selection in the 1991 NHL Entry Draft (Peter Ambroziak).
 The Boston Bruins traded their second round selection in 1990 to the Philadelphia Flyers for Brian Propp.
 The Philadelphia Flyers traded Darren Jensen and Daryl Stanley to the Vancouver Canucks for Wendell Young and the Canucks' third round selection in 1990.
 The Philadelphia Flyers traded Wendell Young and their seventh round selection in 1990 to the Pittsburgh Penguins for the Penguins' third round selection in 1990.
 The Philadelphia Flyers traded Kevin Maguire and their eighth round selection in the 1991 NHL Entry Draft (Dmitri Mironov) to the Toronto Maple Leafs for the Leafs' third round selection in 1990.
 New Jersey Devils traded Alain Chevrier and their seventh round selection in the 1989 NHL Entry Draft (Doug Evans) to the Winnipeg Jets for Steve Rooney and the Jets' third round selection in 1990.
 The Chicago Blackhawks traded their third round selection in 1990 to the Montreal Canadiens for Jocelyn Lemieux.
 The Buffalo Sabres traded Tom Barrasso and their third round selection in 1990 to the Pittsburgh Penguins for Doug Bodger and Darrin Shannon.
 The New Jersey Devils traded Joe Cirella, Claude Loiselle, and their eighth round selection in 1990 to the Quebec Nordiques for Walt Poddubny and the Nordiques' fourth round selection in 1990.
 The Edmonton Oilers traded Normand Lacombe to the Philadelphia Flyers for the Flyers' fourth round selection in 1990.
 The Los Angeles Kings received the New York Islanders' fourth round selection in 1990 as compensation for the Islanders signing Glenn Healy.
 The Los Angeles Kings traded the New York Islanders' fourth round selection in 1990 (previously acquired) to the New York Rangers for Barry Beck.
 The Los Angeles Kings traded their fourth round selection in 1990 to the New York Rangers for Dean Kennedy.
 The Minnesota North Stars traded Mike Gartner to the New York Rangers for Ulf Dahlen and Los Angeles' fourth round selection in 1990 (previously acquired).
 The New Jersey Devils traded their fourth round selection in 1990 to the Winnipeg Jets for George McPhee.
 The St. Louis Blues traded Kent Carlson, their twelfth round selection in the 1989 NHL Entry Draft (Sergei Kharin), and their fourth round selection in 1990 to the Winnipeg Jets for Peter Douris.
 The Edmonton Oilers traded their fourth round selection in 1990 to the Toronto Maple Leafs for Vladimir Ruzicka.
 The New York Rangers received the Quebec Nordiques' fifth round selection in 1990 as compensation for the Nordiques signing Guy Lafleur.
 The Detroit Red Wings traded their fifth round selection in 1990 to the New York Rangers for Jim Pavese.
 The Detroit Red Wings traded Kris King to the New York Rangers for Chris McRae and Detroit's fifth round selection in 1990 (previously acquired).
 The Toronto Maple Leafs traded their fifth round selection in 1990 to the Washington Capitals for Lou Franceschetti.
 The Buffalo Sabres traded Lindy Ruff to the New York Rangers for the Rangers' fifth round selection in 1990.
 The Hartford Whalers traded Carey Wilson and their fifth round selection in 1990 to the New York Rangers for Brian Lawton, Don Maloney, and Norm Maciver.
 The Buffalo Sabres traded Jacques Cloutier and their sixth round selection in 1990 to the Chicago Blackhawks for Steve Ludzik and the Blackhawks' fifth round selection in 1990.
 The Calgary Flames traded their fifth round selection in 1990 to the New Jersey Devils for Jim Korn.
 The Pittsburgh Penguins traded Rod Buskas to the Vancouver Canucks for the Canucks' sixth round selection in 1990.
 The Buffalo Sabres traded Wayne Van Dorp to the Chicago Blackhawks for the Blackhawks' seventh round selection in 1990.
 The Buffalo Sabres traded their seventh round selection in 1990 to the Pittsburgh Penguins for Wayne Van Dorp.
 The St. Louis Blues traded Rob Whistle and their eighth round selection in 1990 to the Washington Capitals for the Capitals' sixth round selection in the 1989 NHL Entry Draft (Derek Frenette).

References
General

Specific

External links
1990 NHL Entry Draft player stats at The Internet Hockey Database

Draft
National Hockey League Entry Draft
Dr
NHL Entry